Sónia Lopes (born 6 April 1975) is a Cape Verdean middle distance and long-distance runner.

Career
Almeida first competed for Cape Verde at the 2000 IAAF World Cross Country Championships in Vilamoura, Portugal where she placed 118th in the Women's short race in a time of 18:33. The following year at the 2001 IAAF World Indoor Championships in Lisbon, Almeida recorded a personal best and national record time of 11:37.38 in the heats of the 3000 metres. Five months later at the World Outdoor Championships in Edmonton, Lopes placed 35th in the 1500 metres with a time of 5:13.80. The following year at the 2002 African Championships in Athletics in Radès, Tunisia, she finished last in the 1500 metres but with an improved time of 4:56.92. In 2003, Lopes competed in the 2003 IAAF World Half Marathon Championships in Vilamoura, finishing in 59th in 1:24:59 and in the marathon at the 2003 World Championships, finishing in last place in 3:21:59. Two years later she was back on track running the 1500 metres in 4:51.29 at the 2005 World Championships in Helsinki.

Personal bests
Below is Euclides Lopes' personal best times.

References

1975 births
Living people
Place of birth missing (living people)
Cape Verdean female long-distance runners
Cape Verdean female middle-distance runners
Cape Verdean steeplechase runners
Female steeplechase runners